Moses Kibet (born 23 March 1991) is a Ugandan middle- and long-distance runner. He represented his country at the 2009, 2011, and 2015 World Championships.

International competitions

Personal bests
Outdoor
1500 metres – 3:43.75 (Nijmegen 2009)
3000 metres – 8:05.04 (Nijmegen 2008)
5000 metres – 13:15.18 (Heusden-Zolder 2011)
10,000 metres – 28:05.71 (Ferrara 2014)
15 kilometres – 43:24 (Copenhagen 2014)
20 kilometres – 58:42 (Copenhagen 2014)
Half marathon – 1:01:37 (Lisbon 2016)

References

External links

1991 births
Living people
Ugandan male long-distance runners
Ugandan male middle-distance runners
World Athletics Championships athletes for Uganda
Athletes (track and field) at the 2014 Commonwealth Games
People from Bukwo District
Commonwealth Games competitors for Uganda
20th-century Ugandan people
21st-century Ugandan people